Alto de Nique is a mountain in South and Central America.

References

Mountains of Colombia
Mountains of Panama
International mountains of North America
International mountains of South America
Colombia–Panama border